Abgeschminkt! is a German film directed by Katja von Garnier. It was released in 1993.

External links
 

1993 films
1993 romantic comedy films
German romantic comedy films
1990s German-language films
1990s female buddy films
Films about fictional painters
Films directed by Katja von Garnier
1990s German films